Sidi Salah Bou Kabrine Mosque was a Tunisian mosque located in northern suburb of the medina of Tunis.
It does not exist anymore.

Localization
The mosque was located in Sidi Aloui Street.

Etymology
It got its name from a saint, Sidi Salah Bou Kabrine, whose tomb is between Bizerte and Mateur.

History
It got destroyed after the replanning of the Sidi Aloui Street.

References 

Mosques in Tunis